Leighton McIntosh (born 11 February 1993) is a Scottish footballer who plays as a winger or forward for Cove Rangers.

He began his career at Dundee and during his time there scored some important goals to help them avoid relegation from the Scottish Championship during their administration troubles. He has also had spells at Airdrieonians, Montrose, Arbroath, Peterhead and UMF Selfoss in Iceland.

Career

Dundee
Promoted to the first team following Dundee going into administration and nine of their first team players being released. Mcintosh made his debut on 11 December 2010 as a substitute against Morton in the Scottish First Division. He made 12 appearances scoring 4 goals that season. His contribution to Dundee's relegation survival was recognised when he won Young Player of the Month award for April 2011. On 12 May 2011 he signed a new three-year contract for Dundee.

McIntosh spent the 2012–13 season on loan at Montrose On 31 January 2014, he moved on loan to Arbroath. After Dundee secured promotion to the Scottish Premiership in May 2014 he was released by the club.

Montrose
McIntosh signed for Montrose in September 2014, on a short term contract until January 2015. He made his debut on 21 September 2014, in Montrose's 1–0 win against Elgin City.

Peterhead
McIntosh signed for League 1 Peterhead on 24 July 2015 following an impressive trial. He has made an instant impact helping the team to an impressive 5–3 win over Falkirk in the Petrofac Cup and scoring the winner over Dunfermline in a potential title decider. On 14 November 2015 McIntosh scored the winner in a 2–1 victory over Queens Park to send Peterhead into their first senior cup final. On 21 November 2015 McIntosh scored his first senior hat-trick for Peterhead in a 7–0 win against Cowdenbeath.

McIntosh's prolific form in front of goal in November was rightfully rewarded by receiving the Ladbrokes League 1 Player of the Month award which is decided by votes from members of the Scottish media. McIntosh finished the 2015–16 season with 14 goals in 16 starts and was voted Peterhead's young player of the year in what was a successful campaign with Peterhead reaching their first professional cup final and reaching the league play-offs. He left the club at the end of the 2016–17 season following the club's relegation to Scottish League Two.

UMF Selfoss
On 2 August 2017, McIntosh signed for Icelandic club Selfoss.

Arbroath
On his return to Scotland, McIntosh joined Scottish League One side Arbroath, scoring twice on his debut. After scoring the winner against promotion chasing Ayr United on 6 January 2018, and to take his Arbroath tally to 6 goals in 7 appearances, McIntosh was named in the SPFL Team of the Week. McIntosh was released by the club at the end of the 2017–18 season.

Airdrieonians
McIntosh signed for Scottish League One side Airdrionians for the 2018 season and scored in their 3–0 victory at Berwick Rangers in the Scottish League Cup. After scoring a double in a 3–0 win against league champions Arbroath on 27 April 2019, and to take his Airdrie tally to 14 goals for the season, McIntosh was named in the SPFL Team of the Week. McIntosh scored a hat-trick in a 4–1 victory over Stranraer  to finish as the club's top scorer for the 2018–2019 season with 17 goals. He left the club in May 2019.

Wrexham
On 31 May 2019, McIntosh signed for National League club Wrexham.

On 14 February 2020, McIntosh was loaned to National League North side Blyth Spartans.

Wrexham chose not to renew McIntosh's contract for the following season.

Cove Rangers
On 10 August 2020, McIntosh signed with newly-promoted Scottish League One side Cove Rangers.

International career
McIntosh has represented the Scotland under-19 team.

Career statistics

References

External links

1993 births
Living people
Scottish Premier League players
Scottish Football League players
Dundee F.C. players
Scottish footballers
Association football forwards
Footballers from Dundee
Montrose F.C. players
Arbroath F.C. players
Airdrieonians F.C. players
Wrexham A.F.C. players
Blyth Spartans A.F.C. players
Cove Rangers F.C. players
Scottish Professional Football League players
Leighton McIntosh
National League (English football) players
Scotland youth international footballers